Goldie & Bear is an American animated children's television series which began on September 12, 2015. The show was created for Disney Junior by Jorge Aguirre and Rick Gitelson. It was directed by Chris Gilligan and produced using CGI animation. It featured songs by Rob Cantor and score by Greg Nicolett and Gregory James Jenkins. Season one was produced by Milk Barn Animation and lasted from September 12, 2015 to August 15, 2016. The second season, produced by Titmouse, Inc, ran from September 18, 2017 to October 1, 2018.

Plot
The series centers on Goldilocks (nicknamed Goldie) and little Jack Bear, who after the incident in the Bear's house end up being best friends. Throughout the series, they go onto the Fairy Tale Forest as they meet other characters from various fairy tales and nursery rhymes such as Little Red Riding Hood, Three Little Pigs, Humpty Dumpty, Jack Horner, among others.

Characters

Main
 Goldilocks "Goldie" (voiced by Natalie Lander) is an 11-year-old girl who becomes best friends with Jack Bear after accidentally breaking his favorite chair. She wears a short-sleeved blue dress, a pink bow in her golden hair, white stockings with a light purple stripe on top, and pink shoes. Neither of her parents appeared until her father Robin Locks appeared in the season 1 finale "When Goldie Met Bear". In the season 2 premiere "Goldie's High-Flying Adventure", her mother Mrs. Locks is introduced.
 Jack Bear (voiced by Georgie Kidder) is Mama & Papa Bear's 8-year-old son who met Goldie after she accidentally broke his favorite chair. At first, he and Goldie don't get along but they later forgive each other and go on many adventures together.

Recurring
 Mama Bear (voiced by Mary Birdsong) is Jack Bear's mother who is an excellent cook and baker. She is also a world-renowned troll tamer.
 Papa Bear (voiced by Barry Wiggins) is Jack Bear's father who is an excellent builder. He also likes to go fishing and sometimes takes his son Jack Bear along.
 Robin Locks (voiced by Michael McKean) is Goldie's father who is the Fairytale Forest barber. He debuted in "When Goldie Met Bear" and has made several appearances in season 2.
 Marian Locks (voiced by Jane Lynch) is Goldie's mother who travels around the world collecting items her customers are looking to buy. She uses a special wheelchair that can connect to her cart (which she uses to fly around the world) and has many helpful gadgets. She is first mentioned in "When Goldie Met Bear" and officially debuted in the Season 2 premiere "Goldie's Great Adventure". 
 Grandma May is Goldie's grandmother and Marian's mother. She travels all over the world and sends Goldie various treasures. She debuted in "Goldie's Do Over Day" with a dramatic entrance. 
 Magic Gnome (voiced by David Lodge) is a friendly gnome who lives in a tree in Fairytale Forest. He can often be found helping anyone who needs it and anyone who does find him receives one wish (but only the first time).
 Aloysius (voiced by Jim Cummings) is a wolf who is also called Big Bad. Whenever he isn't huffing and puffing and blowing down other people's homes, he steals muffins, cakes, and other goodies from either Little Red Riding Hood or from people's windowsills, usually serving as the series' main antagonist. Despite his big bad exterior and antagonistic role (specially towards Goldie and Bear, who always foil his plans), he has a softer side that comes out from time to time. He likes playing with kittens and is quite the drummer (though he prefers to be a "lone wolf" when it comes to performing).
 Phil (voiced by Tom Kenny) is Aloysius' older brother who is known as the Big Good Wolf because of his kindness and ability to help others.
 Little Red Riding Hood (voiced by Justine Huxley) is an 11-year-old girl is also called Little Red. She has brown hair and green eyes and wears a red cape and hood that her grandmother had given her. In "Do You Know the Muffin Kids", it is revealed that Red's father is the Muffin Man.
 Granny (voiced by Philece Sampler) is Little Red Riding Hood's grandmother.
 Humpty Dumpty (voiced by Mitchell Whitfield) is a book-loving egg who is usually just called Humpty. He is often seen reading one of his books on his stone wall or swimming with his egg group known as the Sunny Side Up Club.
 Jack (voiced by Miles Brown) is the 5-year-old brother of Jill. He is sometimes called Little Jack.
 Jill (voiced by Marsai Martin) is the 7-year-old sister of Jack.
 Fairy Godmother (voiced by Lesley Nicol) is a kind-hearted fairy who grants people's wishes, but she sometimes messes up her spells and fixes them up immediately.
 The Three Little Pigs – each has a name themed after their construction material.
 Brix (voiced by David Kaufman) is the older brother of Twigs and Baley. He built his own house and builds other projects with bricks.
 Twigs (voiced by Kath Soucie) is the girl pig builds with sticks. She is also called Queen Twigs.
 Bailey (voiced by David Lodge) is the straw-piling male.
 The King's Men are the servants of the King.
 Sir Dwight (voiced by Jim Cummings) is the youngest and more clumsy of the three men.
 Sir Kenneth (voiced by David Lodge in most episodes, Mitchell Whitfield in Season 1 Episode 11)
 Sir Reginald (voiced by David Lodge)
 The Trolls are the creatures who live under the bridge and like shiny objects.
 Troll #1 (voiced by Bayardo DeMurguia)
 Troll #2 (voiced by Jim Cummings)
 Prince Charming (voiced by Scott Foley) is the Fairytale Forest prince who looks out for his subjects and is good friends with Goldie and Bear.
 Jack (voiced by David Kaufman) is a 10-year-old boy who lives in a barn with his pet goose Goosey, the goose who lays the golden eggs and Cow, the cow who jumps over the moon once a year. He is good friends with the Giant who lives at the top of the beanstalk. He is also an excellent drummer. 
 Giant (voiced by Jim Cummings) is a friendly giant who lives in the clouds at the top of the beanstalk. He often loses his things, which end up in Fairytale Forrest below and loves joining in the fun. 
 Little Old Woman (voiced by Justine Huxley) is a kind woman who lives in a shoe with her many children. She is a tough negotiator but is also very kind. She and her children debuted in "Fee Fi Fo Shoe".
 Jack B. Nimble (voiced by Justin Felbinger) is a 10-year-old boy who is often rude and selfish. He enjoys playing buttercup ball and dreams of becoming famous.
 Jack Horner (voiced by Miles Brown) is a 5 year old little boy who is fond of plum pie and drawing. He likes buttercup ball and while he is not very good at playing he can draw up winning plays for his friends.
 Frog is a frog who is good friends with Goldie and Bear. He was the first to meet Goldie when she moved to Fairytale Forest and can often be seen following close behind on her adventures.
 Ginger (voiced by Maya Ritter) is a kind witch who lives in the forest and has a purple cat named Sprinkles.
 Brian (voiced by Thomas Lennon) is a mouse who is convinced he is bad luck until Goldie and Bear realize he needs glasses. He debuted in "Hickory Dickory Brian" where it is revealed to the clock fixer Hickory Dickory Dock. In "The Royal Cheese Mystery" his appreciation for and knowledge of cheese comes in handy when cheese goes missing.
 Little Witch Rosita (voiced by Isabella Day) is a young witch who lost her broom Ryo and befriends Goldie and Bear. 
 Vern (voiced by Dee Bradley Baker) is an inchworm who is trying to find the Fairy Fly Tree in the Enchanted Forrest.
 Skippy (voiced by Dee Bradley Baker) is a baby dragon who lives on Misty Mountain with his mom. He is very good friends with Bear who he befriended soon after he hatched.

One-time characters 

 Magic Cobbler (voiced by David Lodge) is Gnome's magical cousin who only appears in "Bear's Red Shoes".
 Norm (voiced by Asher Kidder) is Gnome's nephew that only appears in "Adorable Norm".
 Rumpelstiltskin (voiced by David L. Lander) is Gnome's other cousin who only appears in "Gnome Family Reunion".
 Thumbelina (voiced by Debby Ryan) is a thumb-sized lady that only appears in "Thumbelina's Wild Ride".

Side characters 

 Big Bart is a legendary fish in Goldie & Bear that lives in Big Fish Lake. He was caught by Bear's uncle, but it got away. He was the target of Bear, Goldie and Mr. Bear on their fishing trip, but instead they caught his little brother Little Mike. He has grown a lot since he was caught by Bear's uncle, and is now the size of a whale.
 Billy Gruff is a minor character from the Disney Junior show Goldie & Bear. He was Bear's old friend before he moved away. He appears in the episode "Billy the Kid". as Cherami Leigh
 Cow is a very famous cattle from the Goldie & Bear series. She belongs to Jack; Once a year, she and a randomly chosen participant gets to ride her when she jumps over the moon. The previous year's winner was Humpty, and this year's winner was Goldie. Before the jump, the kids take pictures of Cow and the winner before the big jump, which happens after sunset. Cow is shown to be very scared of mice and will charge when she spots one.
 Dragons are legendary creatures, typically with serpentine or reptilian traits, that are featured in the myths of many cultures.
 Gingerbread Jimmy is a minor character from the Disney Junior show Goldie & Bear. He appeared in the episode "Gingerbread Jimmy's Fantastical Forest". as Wayne Knight
 Itsy is a spider that climbs up the water spout on the Bears' home. Goldie is scared of him and other spiders. But he helped and showed her that not all spiders are bad creatures. Itsy got his name from Bear. He was accidentally made big by Fairy Godmother. Itsy later appeared in "Team Tiny", when Goldie and Bear teamed up with him, Brian, and Vern to retrieve Mama Bear's ring from the Mouse King. as Jesse Corti
 Little Mike is a big fish that lives in Big Fish Lake. He was caught by Bear; he, Bear and Goldie took a photo. He is the little brother to Big Bart. He can talk and is very polite to the Bears and Goldie. He is mistaken for his older brother.
 The Little Old Woman's Kids has so many kids, each had a different personality and names. They complained about not getting what they wanted and Little Old Woman would solve there problems. Other than complaining they all love buttercup ball. They make up mostly the background kids of the Fairy Tale Forest.
 Dylan
 Lisa
 Kyle
 Mother Goose is a large goose that lives in Fairy Tale Forest. She helps out the kids with activities like who will ride the Cow when it is jumping over the moon. On odd occasions, she likes to hang out with her kin. One of her favorite pastimes is spending an afternoon swimming with the geese and resting on the shore of the river. as Mary Birdsong
 The Mouse King is a minor character featured in the Disney Junior show Goldie & Bear. He appeared in the episode "Team Tiny".The Mouse King resided inside the walls of the Bear Family house. He was rumored by Brian big, sneaky, and scary. He lived in a makeshift throne room full of objects he had collected over the years. Of course, the only reason he gathered things was because he longed for something to be proud of. Mama Bear's ring was his latest addition, but after Goldie, Bear and their tiny friends had a discussion with him, the Mouse King gives the ring back, telling about how he never realized how much it meant to her. as Wally Shawn
 Old Man Winter is a character from the Disney Junior animated series Goldie & Bear. He appeared in the episode "Winterchime Day" and is a yearly resident of Fairy Tale Forest. He uses a special snow globe that creates snow and apses with getting the perfect amount of snow. as Brad Norman
 Phyllis and Colton are minor characters from the Disney Junior show Goldie & Bear. They are the royal horses who pull Prince Charming's carriage. They are the subjects of the episode "Horsin' Around". as Yvette Gonzales-Nacer and as Cyrus Arnold
 Pops Weasel is a weasel from Goldie & Bear season 2. He first appears in the episode "Pops Goes the Weasel". A thief and con-artist, he goes around Fairy Tale Forest conning people out of their cupcakes by offering to give them what they want. But what he gives them instead leaves a lot to be desired. For example, he's been known to supply books without words or badly done paintings. It took the team work of Big Bad, Goldie, and Bear to trick the weasel into returning the cupcakes to their friends. Pops later returns in "The Wolf Who Cried Wolf". After finding out Big Bad has taken all the food from the picnic and made up a bandit to blame, Pops decides to snatch the food from the secret stash, knowing Big Bad will get the blame. After Pops is subdued, he is forced to give all the food back. as John Michael Higgins
 Skippy's Mom is a minor character in the Disney Junior show Goldie & Bear. She is a fully grown female dragon. She is very protective of her offspring Skippy, despite the fact that the egg fell out of the nest. Once she recognized her baby, she was reasonably able to take back her child. She was even nice enough to take Goldie and Bear down the mountain.
 Sprites are creatures that appear in the Goldie & Bear episode, "Sprites on the Loose". They are voiced by Dee Bradley Baker.
 Tess is a minor character in Goldie & Bear. She is a giantess who lives in the clouds. She likes to play the harp. as Jennie Kwan
 The Tooth Fairy is a legendary creature for all children and adults in the fairy tale forest. When a kid loses a tooth, they put it under their pillow for the tooth fairy to collect, and in the morning, they get a shiny gold coin. Bear lost his first baby tooth and tried to get to sleep so the Tooth Fairy could come and get his tooth. But Jack and Jill wanted to stay up all night. In the end, Bear's tooth finally gets to the Tooth Fairy. as Kath Soucie
 The Woodsman is a minor antagonist in the Disney Junior animated series, Goldie & Bear. His role is mainly to cut down trees throughout Fairy Tale Forest. He tried to cut down the Magic Gnome's tree, but was stopped by Bear after seeing how big he had become. Next, he cut down a tree near a bridge and the tree fell down destroying the bridge. Then recently, he tried to cut down Old Knotty so a new road can go from the king's castle directly to the lake, but it too came to a halt when the residents of the forest protested the cutting of the tree. It was Prince Charming who came and put an end to the protests by changing the road plan. Instead of going straight through the tree's location, it would go around the tree. as Mitchell Whitfield
 Gene, is the Genie from Goldie & Bear in "Any Wish You Wish". as Leo Gragani
 Jack's Mom as Mary Birdsong
 Goosey
 Worm as Dee Bradley Baker
 Gene's Dad as Dee Bradley Baker
 Coachman as Tom Kenny
 Gene's Mom as Philece Sampler
 Mary Mary as Alisan Porter
 Don Huevo as Philip Anthony-Rodriguez
 Murray The Muffin Man as Jim Hanks
 Burgermeister as Dino Andrade
 Jack Bear's Great Grandfather

Episodes

Broadcast history
The series premiered on Disney Junior on September 12, 2015 in the U.S, and in Canada on the Disney Junior block on Disney Channel on September 18, and TVNZ2 and on TVNZ KidZone programming block on TVNZ2 in New Zealand.

Merchandise
In August 2016, Just Play released a line of toys based on the series available exclusively at Toys R Us.

Home media
Home media is distributed by Walt Disney Studios Home Entertainment.

References

External links
Official website on Disney+
 

2010s American animated television series
2015 American television series debuts
2018 American television series endings
American children's animated adventure television series
American children's animated fantasy television series
American children's animated musical television series
Television shows based on fairy tales
Disney Junior original programming
Television series by Disney
Disney animated television series
Animated television series about bears
Animated television series about children
Television series about wolves
American computer-animated television series
American preschool education television series
Forests in fiction
Animated preschool education television series
2010s preschool education television series
English-language television shows